Ibón Gutiérrez Fernández (born 10 July 1984) is a Spanish former professional footballer who played as a defensive midfielder.

Club career
Gutiérrez was born in Bilbao, Biscay. A product of Athletic Bilbao's prolific youth ranks, he appeared in six first-team matches during 2005–06 (five complete), the first coming on 27 August 2005 in a 3–0 home win against neighbours Real Sociedad. However, he finished the campaign in the Segunda División, loaned to CD Numancia.

Subsequently, Gutiérrez played two seasons in the same level, appearing regularly for CD Castellón after which he left for another club in that tier, Albacete Balompié. In the summer of 2009 he dropped down to Segunda División B, joining recently-relegated Alicante CF, and continued to compete there the following years in representation of a hosts of teams.

References

External links

1984 births
Living people
Spanish footballers
Footballers from Bilbao
Association football midfielders
La Liga players
Segunda División players
Segunda División B players
Tercera División players
Danok Bat CF players
CD Basconia footballers
Bilbao Athletic footballers
Athletic Bilbao footballers
CD Numancia players
CD Castellón footballers
Albacete Balompié players
Alicante CF footballers
Deportivo Alavés players
Sestao River footballers
UE Sant Andreu footballers
CF Badalona players